Bentivoglio may refer to:

Bentivoglio (surname)
House of Bentivoglio
Bentivoglio, Emilia-Romagna, a comune (municipality) in Bologna, Italy

See also
Palazzo Bentivoglio (disambiguation)